Pooja Verma  is a Punjabi film actress best known her role in "Baaz" opposite Babbu Maan. She is born in Delhi.She had appeared in many Punjabi music videos also. She has worked in Punjabi movies such as 22g Tussi Ghaint ho, Dakuan Da Munda and 15 Lakh Kado Aauga. Pooja is also known for appearing in Punjabi music video songs Raatan and Kangna.

Filmography

Music videos

References

"Interview: Pooja Verma Riding High On The Success Wave Of Dakuaan Da Munda". Ghaintpunjab

External links 
 

Living people
Actresses in Punjabi cinema
Year of birth missing (living people)